The National Defence coup d'état was a military uprising in Thessaloniki on 17 August 1916, by Greek Army officers opposed to the neutrality followed by the royal government in Athens during World War I, and sympathetic to former Prime Minister Eleftherios Venizelos and the Entente Powers. With the support of Entente forces present in the area as part of the Salonica front, the coup established control of Thessaloniki and much of the wider region. Soon after, Venizelos with his leading followers arrived in the city to establish a Provisional Government of National Defence, which entered World War I on the side of the Entente. These events marked the culmination and entrenchment of the so-called "National Schism" in Greek politics.

References

Sources
 

Conflicts in 1916
1916 in Greece
Greece in World War I
Military coups in Greece
Eleftherios Venizelos
1910s coups d'état and coup attempts
August 1916 events
Modern history of Thessaloniki